The chief minister of Gandaki Province is the chief executive of the Nepal state of Gandaki Province. In accordance with the Constitution of Nepal, the governor is a state's de jure head, but de facto executive authority rests with the chief minister. Following elections to the Povincial Assembly of Gandaki Province, the state's governor usually invites the party (or coalition) with a majority of seats to form the government. The governor appoints the chief minister, whose council of ministers are collectively responsible to the assembly. Given the confidence of the assembly, the chief minister's term is for five years and is subject to no term limits.

Since 2018, two people have been Chief Minister of Gandaki Province. Prithvi Subba Gurung from CPN (Unified Marxist–Leninist) was appointed as first Chief Minister of Gandaki Province from 16 February 2018  to  9 May 2021. After securing majority in Provincial Assembly of Gandaki Province, Krishna Chandra Nepali Pokharel of the Nepali Congress assumed office on 12 June 2021.

List

See also 
Chief Minister of Province No. 1
Chief Minister of Madhesh Province
Chief Minister of Bagmati Province
Chief Minister of Lumbini Province
Chief Minister of Karnali Province 
Chief Minister of Sudurpashchim Province

References

External links 

Governors
 
Heads of government

 Website of the Office of the Chief Minister